This is a list of the heads of state of Italy. The first to take the title was Odoacer, a barbarian military leader, in the late 5th century, followed by the Ostrogothic kings up to the mid-6th century. With the Frankish conquest of Italy in the 8th century, the Carolingians assumed the title, which was maintained by subsequent Holy Roman Emperors throughout the Middle Ages. The last Emperor to claim the title was Charles V in the 16th century. During this period, the holders of the title were crowned with the Iron Crown of Lombardy.

From the unification of Italy in 1861 to 1946 the head of state was the King of Italy, who was the same person as the King of Sardinia according to the Constitution. Italy became a republic under the Constitution of 1948 and the monarch was replaced by a President.

Monarchs

As "Rex Italiae"
 Odoacer (476–493)
vassal of the Eastern Roman Empire.

Ostrogothic Kingdom (493 – 553)
 Theoderic the Great (493 – 526)
 Athalaric (526 – 534)
 Theodahad (534 – 536)
 Witiges (536 – 540)
 Ildibad (540 – 541)
 Eraric (541)
 Totila (541 – 552)
 Teia (552 – 553)

Kingdom of the Lombards (568 – 814)

 Alboin (568 – 572)
 Cleph (572 – 574)
 Rule of the dukes (ten-year interregnum)
 Authari (584 – 590)
 Agilulf (591 – c. 616)
 Adaloald (c. 616 – c. 626)
 Arioald (c. 626 – 636)
 Rothari (636 – 652)
 Rodoald (652 – 653)
 Aripert I (653 – 661)
 Perctarit and Godepert (661 – 662)
 Grimoald (662 – 671)
 Perctarit (671 – 688), restored from exile
 Alahis (688 – 689), rebel
 Cunincpert (688 – 700)
 Liutpert (700 – 701)
 Raginpert (701)
 Aripert II (701 – 712)
 Ansprand (712)
 Liutprand (712 – 744)
 Hildeprand (744)
 Ratchis (744 – 749)
 Aistulf (749 – 756)
 Desiderius (756 – 774)
 Charlemagne (774 – 814)

Kingdom of Italy (781 – 962)

Carolingian Dynasty (781 – 888)
 Pippin (781 – 810)
 Bernard (810 – 818)
 Louis I (818 – 822)
 Lothair I (822 – 855)
 Louis II (844 – 875)
 Charles II the Bald (875 – 877)
 Carloman (877 – 879)
 Charles III the Fat (879 – 887)

Instability (888 – 962)

After 887, Italy fell into instability, with many rulers claiming the kingship simultaneously:
 Berengar I (888 – 896)
vassal of the German King Arnulf of Carinthia, reduced to Friuli 889-894, deposed by Arnulf in 896.
 Guy of Spoleto (889 – 894)
opponent of Berengar, ruled most of Italy but was deposed by Arnulf.
 Lambert of Spoleto (891 – 896)
subking of his father Guy before 894, reduced to Spoleto 894–895.
 Arnulf of Carinthia (894 – 899)
 Ratold (sub-king 896)

In 896, Arnulf and Ratold lost control of Italy, which was divided between Berengar and Lambert:
 Berengar I (896 – 924)
seized Lambert's portion upon the latter's death in 898.
 Lambert of Spoleto (896 – 898)
 Louis III of Provence (900-905)
opposed Berengar 900-902 and 905.
 Rudolph II of Burgundy (922 – 933)
defeated Berengar but fled Italy in 926.
 Hugh of Arles (926 – 947)
elected by Berengar's partisans in 925, resigned to Provence after 945.
 Lothair II of Arles (945 – 950)
 Berengar II of Ivrea (950 – 961)
jointly with his son:
 Adalbert of Ivrea (950 – 961)

In 951 Otto I of Germany invaded Italy and was crowned with the Iron Crown of Lombardy. In 952, Berengar and Adalbert became his vassals but remained kings until being deposed by Otto.

Holy Roman Empire (962 – 1556)

Ottonian dynasty (962 – 1024)

Salian dynasty (1027 – 1125)

Süpplingenburg dynasty (1125 – 1137)

Hauteville dynasty (1130 – 1154)

Roger II used the title King of Sicily and Italy until at least 1135; later he used only the title King of Sicily, Apulia and Calabria. Although his realm included the southern Italian mainland, he never exerted any control over the official Kingdom of Italy, and none of his successors claimed the title King of Italy.

House of Hohenstaufen (1128 – 1197)

House of Welf (1208 – 1212)

House of Hohenstaufen (1212 – 1254)

House of Luxembourg (1311 – 1313)

House of Wittelsbach (1327 – 1347)

House of Luxembourg (1355 – 1437)

House of Habsburg (1437 – 1556)

Charles V was the last emperor to be crowned king of Italy, or to officially use the title. The Habsburg emperors claimed the Italian crown until 1801. The empire continued to include Italian territories until its dissolution in 1806.

Kingdom of Italy (1805–1814), House of Bonaparte

Full title
This title is present on Italian laws proclaimed by Napoleon I:

[Name], by the Grace of God and the Constitutions, Emperor of the French and King of Italy.

Kingdom of Italy (1861–1946), House of Savoy
The succession to the throne of Italy was the same as the succession to the throne of the Sardinia.

Provisional head of state
After the constitutional referendum which took place at the same time as the general election 54.3% voted for a republic. The Constituent Assembly which had the power to rule Italy until a new constitution for the republic was drawn up. The provisional Head of State after Alcide De Gasperi who exercised the powers after the King of Italy left was Enrico De Nicola who was proclaimed in 1946 but he was called Temporary Chief of State because he did not want to be called President of the Republic until the constitution was law.

Presidents
Under the Constitution, the first constitution of the Republic of Italy, the President replaced the monarch as ceremonial head of state. The President was elected by Parliament and Regional governments for a seven-year term. In the event of a vacancy the President of the Senate served as Acting President.

 Parties
Traditionally, Presidents have not been members of any political party during their tenure, in order to be considered above partisan interests. The parties shown are those to which the President belonged at the time they took office.
1946–1993:

Since 1994:

Status

Styles

References

.
Heads of state
Heads of state
Italy
Heads of state
Heads of state